Gallery of Archduke Leopold Wilhelm in Brussels is a 17th-century painting of Archduke Leopold Wilhelm's Italian art collection by the Flemish Baroque painter David Teniers the Younger, now held in the Schleissheim Palace.

The painting shows the Archduke as a collector pointing with his cane towards a few paintings propped against each other on the floor. Behind him is the artist wearing a gold chain and sword, the attributes of honor for his role as gallery director for the archduke. Above the door is a portrait of another patron of the artist, King Philip IV of Spain, and behind the large paintings on the right is a bust on a pedestal of Queen Christina of Sweden. On the left behind the table is an assistant holding a print. The table foot has been documented as a creation of the sculptor Adriaen de Vries depicting Ganymede. The paintings are arranged in rows on the walls, and is one of the paintings that David Teniers the Younger prepared to document the Archduke's collection before he employed 12 engravers to publish his Theatrum Pictorium, considered the "first illustrated art catalog". He published this book of engravings after the Archduke had moved to Austria and taken his collection with him. It was published in Antwerp in 1659 and again in 1673.

In her catalog raisonné of Teniers' works, Margret Klinge dates this painting after 1654 because in the similar gallery painting dated 1653 his portrait does not show the keys, chain, and sword that he is shown wearing in the portrait by Philips Fruytiers dated 1655. Furthermore, the painting of The Three Philosophers and several other Italian paintings are painted in mirror image, which may indicate that he was working from his miniature copy rather than the original, which would have been a necessity after the Archduke left Brussels with his collection to return to Vienna in 1656.

List of paintings depicted
The following is a list of the recognizable paintings of the collection, not all of which were included in the Italian catalog prepared by Teniers, which was a selection of 243 of the most prized paintings out of a collection of 1300-1400 pieces. Many are still in the Viennese collection. Here is a list of the paintings depicted, which starts with the paintings at the top left, running from left to right and from top to bottom and continuing in the same way with the rear wall on the right.

References 

 David Teniers and the Theatre of Painting, exhibition 19 October 2006 to 21 January 2007 on website of the Courtauld Institute of Art
 Catalog nr. 79 with an itemized list of the paintings on display, in David Teniers de Jonge : Schilderijen Tekeningen, exhibition catalog Koninklijk Museum voor Schone Kunsten 11 mei - 1 September 1991, by Margret Klinge, Snoeck, 1991, 
 Room 9 description in Schleissheim Palace

1650s paintings
17th-century paintings
Collections of museums in Germany
Paintings in the collection of the Archduke Leopold Wilhelm of Austria
Paintings of art galleries
Paintings by David Teniers the Younger